Wuhan North railway station is the main freight railway station and marshalling yard of the Wuhan railway hub and metropolitan area, in China's Hubei Province. Administratively, it is in Hengdian Subdistrict (横店街道) of Wuhan's Huangpi District.

Overview
One of the largest facilities of its kind in the nation, Wuhan North railway station has 112 tracks and over 650 switches. It occupies  of land.

There are several other rail freight facilities in Wuhan, including Wuchang South and Wuchang West stations.

Wuhan North was opened on May 18, 2009, replacing the Jiang'an West marshalling yard, which has since been converted into a facility for servicing China Railway High-speed trainsets. In 2022, the station was expanded.

Passenger service

Primarily a freight facility, Wuhan North is not listed in normal passenger train schedule systems (such as http://www.12306.cn/ ). However, a special commuter train, primarily for the needs of workers employed at and around Wuhan North station, runs between Wuhan North and Wuchang South station (a freight station in Wuchang District, south of Wuchang railway station), with stops at both Hankou and Wuchang stations.

References

Stations on the Beijing–Guangzhou Railway
Railway stations in Wuhan
Railway stations in China opened in 2009